Sylva is an album by American jazz fusion group Snarky Puppy that was released on May 26, 2015. It was a collaboration between the band and the Metropole Orkest from the Netherlands. It won the Grammy Award for Best Contemporary Instrumental Album at the 58th Annual Grammy Awards. According to Michael League, each song on the album is about a different forest.

Track listing

Personnel

Snarky Puppy
 Michael League – bass guitar, Moog bass
 Mike Maher – trumpet, flugelhorn
 Jay Jennings – trumpet, flugelhorn
 Chris Bullock – tenor saxophone, bass clarinet, clarinet
 Cory Henry – Hammond B3 organ, Moog, clavinet
 Bill Laurance – piano, Wurlitzer, Moog
 Justin Stanton – Fender Rhodes, Moog, clavinet, piano, trumpet
 Bob Lanzetti – electric guitar
 Mark Lettieri – electric guitar
 Chris McQueen – electric guitar
 Robert "Sput" Searight – drums
 Nate Werth – percussion

Metropole Orkest
Conductor - Jules Buckley
1st Violin - Arlia de Ruiter (concertmaster), Vera Laporeva, Denis Koenders, David Peijnenborgh, Pauline Terlouw, Casper Donker, Ruben Margarita, Tinka Regter, Seijia Teeuwen, Ewa Zbyszynska
2nd Violin - Merijn Rombout, Herman van Haaren, Wim Kok, Feyona van Iersel, Pauline Koning, Polina Cekov, Merel Jonker, Christina Knoll
Viola - Mieke Honingh, Norman Jansen, Julia Jowett, Isabella Petersen, Iris Schut, Lex Luijnenburg
Cello - Maarten Jansen, Emile Visser, Jascha Albracht, Annie Tangberg, Charles Watt
Double Bass - Erik Winkelmann, Arend Liefkes, Tjerk de Vos
Flute - Janine Abbas, Mariël van den Bos, Nola Exel
Clarinet, Bass Clarinet, Contrabass Clarinet, and Saxophone - Paul van der Feen, Leo van Oostrom, Leo Janssen, Werner Janssen, Max Boeree
Horn - Pieter Hunfeld, Rob van de Laar, Fons Verspaandonk, Elizabeth Hunfeld
Trombone - Jan Oosting, Vincent Veneman, Jan Bastiani
Bass Trombone - Martin van den Berg
Tuba - Ries Schellekens
Percussion - Murk Jiskoot, Frank Warndenier

References

2015 albums
Snarky Puppy albums
Grammy Award for Best Contemporary Instrumental Album